Entoloma rhodopolium, commonly known as the wood pinkgill, is a poisonous mushroom found in Europe and Asia. In fact, it is one of the three most commonly implicated fungi in cases of mushroom poisoning in Japan (Other two are Omphalotus japonicus and Tricholoma ustale). E. rhodopolium is often mistaken for edible mushroom, E. sarcopum. Symptoms are predominantly gastrointestinal in nature, though muscarine, muscaridine, and choline have been isolated as toxic agents.

The taxonomy of this species is currently unclear, with several different forms identified in North America, and questions over whether the European and North American fungi are even the same species.

Entoloma is a genus of pink spored fungi. An alternate scientific name seen is Rhodophyllus rhodopolius, from Quelet's broader genus containing a larger subsection of pink-spored fungi.

Entoloma nidorosum, previously considered a separate species, is now classified as a variety of this fungus.

See also
List of Entoloma species

Gallery

References

Poisonous fungi
Entolomataceae
Fungi of Europe
Fungi of Asia
Taxa named by Elias Magnus Fries